Danish Farooq Bhat (born 9 May 1996) is an Indian professional footballer who plays as a midfielder for Indian Super League club Kerala Blasters and the India national team.

Club career

Early career
Danish started his early football career with a local team Chinar Valley FC. Later, Danish joined the J&K Bank Football Academy at the age of 13, where he would become the team captain eventually at his age group level teams. He would go on to win 12 local leagues and tournaments with his team prior to joining Lonestar Kashmir in 2015. He would play for Lonestar Kashmir in the 2015–16 I-League 2nd Division season, where he would help his team reach the final round of the league as his team fell short of promotion to the I-League.

Real Kashmir
In the later half of 2016, he joined Real Kashmir where he was given the number 10 shirt. With 4 strikes, Danish was the joint highest goal-scorer for Real Kashmir in the 2017–18 season. He had the most number of assists to his name during this season as his team became the champions of 2017–18 I-League 2nd Division and won promotion to the I-League. He is one among two Kashmir-born players for Real Kashmir in the first-team squad who have played regularly in this season of I-League.

Bengaluru 
On 25 July 2021, it was announced that Danish had joined Indian Super League club Bengaluru on a two-year deal. On August 15, he made his debut in a 1–0 2021 AFC Cup play-off round win against Maldivian club Eagles. On 24 November, he made his ISL debut as a substitute for Jayesh Rane in a 3–1 loss against Odisha. Danish scored his first ever ISL goal in a 3–3 draw against ATK Mohun Bagan on 16 December.

Kerala Blasters

On 31 January 2023, Danish joined Indian Super League club Kerala Blasters on a three and a half-year deal for a reported fee of ₹2.5 million. He made his debut for the Blasters on 3 November in a 1–0 loss against East Bengal by coming as a substitute for Jeakson Singh in the 75th minute.

International career
In March 2022, Danish was called up for the national squad by coach Igor Štimac ahead of India's two friendly matches against Bahrain and Belarus. He made his debut on 23 March against Bahrain in their 2–1 defeat.

Playing style
Danish earned the moniker of ‘Kashmiri Ronaldo' by fellow footballers and aficionados of the state, demonstrated by his dribbling skills and goal-scoring.

Personal life
Danish was born in the Downtown neighbourhood of Srinagar in the Kashmir Valley of Jammu and Kashmir. 

Danish was inspired by his father, Farooq Ahmad, who was a professional footballer two decades before him. Ahmad represented the Jammu and Kashmir state team in Santosh Trophy and also played for Kolkata giant Mohammedan Sporting.

Career statistics

Club 

Notes

Honours

Real Kashmir
 I-League 2nd Division (1): 2017–18
IFA Shield: 2020

Bengaluru
 Durand Cup: 2022

See also
 Basit Ahmed Bhat

References

1996 births
Living people
Indian people of Kashmiri descent
I-League players
Association football midfielders
Footballers from Jammu and Kashmir
Indian footballers
India international footballers
Real Kashmir FC players
Lonestar Kashmir F.C. players
Bengaluru FC players
People from Srinagar
I-League 2nd Division players
Kerala Blasters FC players